Omar Olivares Palau (born July 6, 1967) is a Puerto Rican former right-handed starting pitcher in Major League Baseball who played for the St. Louis Cardinals (1990–1994), Colorado Rockies (1995), Philadelphia Phillies (1995), Detroit Tigers (1996–97), Seattle Mariners (1997), Anaheim Angels (1998–99), Oakland Athletics (1999–2000) and Pittsburgh Pirates (2001). He batted and threw right-handed.

In a 12-season career, Olivares posted a 77–86 record with 826 strikeouts and a 4.67 ERA in  innings pitched.

As a hitter, Olivares was better than average as pitchers go, posting a .240 batting average (58-for-242) with 25 runs, 5 home runs and 29 RBI.  Considered to be a good athlete, especially for a pitcher, he was occasionally used as a pinch runner and pinch hitter.

See also
 List of second-generation Major League Baseball players

External links

Retrosheet

1967 births
Living people
Anaheim Angels players
Buffalo Bisons (minor league) players
Charleston Rainbows players
Colorado Rockies players
Colorado Springs Sky Sox players
Criollos de Caguas players
Detroit Tigers players
Liga de Béisbol Profesional Roberto Clemente pitchers
Louisville Redbirds players
Major League Baseball pitchers
Major League Baseball players from Puerto Rico
Modesto A's players
Oakland Athletics players
Philadelphia Phillies players
Pittsburgh Pirates players
People from Mayagüez, Puerto Rico
Riverside Red Wave players
Sacramento River Cats players
Scranton/Wilkes-Barre Red Barons players
Seattle Mariners players
St. Louis Cardinals players
Toledo Mud Hens players
Wichita Wranglers players